The 1958–59 Bulgarian Cup was the 19th season of the Bulgarian Cup (in this period the tournament was named Cup of the Soviet Army). Levski Sofia won the competition, beating Spartak Plovdiv 1–0 in the final at the Vasil Levski National Stadium in Sofia.

First round

|-
!colspan="3" style="background-color:#D0F0C0; text-align:left;" |Replay

|}

Second round

|}

Quarter-finals

|}

Semi-finals

|-
|colspan="3" style="background-color:#D0F0C0; text-align=left"|Replay

|}

Final

Details

References

1958-59
1958–59 domestic association football cups
Cup